Christophe Ségura (born 21 August 1974) is a French snowboarder. He competed at the 1998 Winter Olympics and the 2002 Winter Olympics.

References

External links
 

1974 births
Living people
French male snowboarders
Olympic snowboarders of France
Snowboarders at the 1998 Winter Olympics
Snowboarders at the 2002 Winter Olympics
People from Bourg-Saint-Maurice
Sportspeople from Savoie
21st-century French people